Victoria Heighway (born 28 November 1980) is a New Zealand female rugby union player. She played Lock for  internationally and represented Auckland at the provincial level.

Heighway made her Black Ferns test debut, aged 19, on 23 September 2000 against Canada at Winnipeg.

Heighway was a member of the champion 2002, 2006, and 2010 Rugby World Cup sides. She captained the Black Ferns in their tour of England in 2009. She was named New Zealand Women’s Player of the Year twice, in 2007 and 2009.

References

External links
Black Ferns Profile

1980 births
Living people
New Zealand women's international rugby union players
New Zealand female rugby union players
Female rugby union players